Kumarapuram is a village in Alappuzha District of Kerala State of India. This place is mentioned in the famous Malayalam CBI (film series) and is the setting of Oru CBI Diary Kurippu.

Places to visit

Ananthapuram Palace 

Ananthapuram palace is one of the historical palace in Kumarapuram.

Educational Institutions

KKKVM Higher Secondary School 
Kerala Kalidasa Kerala Varma Memorial Higher Secondary School was established in 1960 as LP School. This school got High School status in 1968.

Government Technical High School 
Government Technical High School was established in 1985 and it is managed by the Directorate of Technical Education, Kerala. It is located at south of Kavarattu Sree Mahadeva Temple. The school consists of Grades from 8 to 10.

Government U P School Erickavu  
(Pazhayachira School)
Govt UPS Erickavu was established in 1957 and it is managed by the Department of Education. It is located in Rural area. The school consists of Grades from 1 to 7.

References 

Villages in Alappuzha district